Tronosa may refer to:
Tronoša Monastery
La Tronosa, Panama

See also
Tronoša Chronicle